The Inkigayo Chart is a music program record chart on Seoul Broadcasting System (SBS) that gives an award to the best-performing single of the week in South Korea. The chart measures digital performance in domestic online music services (55%), social media via YouTube views (30%), album sales (10%), network on-air time (10%), advanced viewer votes (5%), and real-time voting via the Freevote mobile app (5%) in its ranking methodology.

As of  2023, 6 singles have reached number one on the chart, and 5 acts has been awarded a first-place trophy. "OMG" by NewJeans currently holds the highest score of the year, with 8,795 points on the January 15 broadcast. One song has collected a trophy for three weeks and earned a Triple Crown: NewJeans's "Ditto".

Chart history

References

2023 in South Korean music
2023 record charts
Lists of number-one songs in South Korea